Yoshiko Shinohara is a Japanese businesswoman. She is the founder of Persol Holdings (formerly known as Temp Holdings), and is Japan's first self-made female billionaire.

As of 2020, Shinohara has a 11% stake in Persol Holdings.

References

Female billionaires
Japanese billionaires
Living people
Year of birth missing (living people)
1930s births